Ryan James Anderson (born December 4, 1992) is an American former basketball player. He is a director of player development and recruiting at Xavier University. He played college basketball at (Arizona) and Boston College.

College career
Anderson started his college career out of Long Beach Polytechnic High School in California at Boston College (BC), where he immediately entered the starting lineup for the rebuilding Eagles. The 6'9" power forward averaged 11.2 points and 7.4 rebounds per game and was named unanimously to the Atlantic Coast Conference (ACC) All-freshman team. He then recorded two more successful seasons at BC, but the team had losing campaigns both years and coach Steve Donahue was fired. Two months after the season ended, Anderson chose to transfer, ultimately landing at Arizona.

After sitting out the 2014–15 season per National Collegiate Athletic Association (NCAA) rules, Anderson had a strong campaign in his only season with the Wildcats. He averaged 15.3 points and 10.1 rebounds per game and was the first Wildcat since Jordan Hill in 2008–09 to average a double-double for the season. At the close of the season, Anderson was named first-team All-Pac-12 Conference.

Professional career
After going undrafted in the 2016 NBA draft, Anderson played for the Orlando Magic in the 2016 NBA Summer League. He ultimately signed with the Antwerp Giants in the Belgian League.

Following the 2016–17 campaign, Anderson signed with s.Oliver Würzburg of the German Basketball Bundesliga.

For 2018–19, Anderson joined the Delaware Blue Coats of the NBA G League.

On January 29, 2020, he has signed with MBC Mykolaiv in the Ukrainian Basketball Superleague. 

On July 11, 2020, he has signed with Šiauliai of the Lithuanian Basketball League.

Coaching career

Arizona Wildcats (2021–2022)
On September 2, 2021, Former Arizona standout Ryan Anderson returning to Wildcats as graduate assistant.

References

External links
Arizona Wildcats bio
Boston College Eagles bio

1992 births
Living people
American expatriate basketball people in Belgium
American expatriate basketball people in Germany
American expatriate basketball people in Lithuania
American men's basketball players
Antwerp Giants players
Arizona Wildcats men's basketball players
Basketball players from Long Beach, California
BC Pieno žvaigždės players
Boston College Eagles men's basketball players
Delaware Blue Coats players
Power forwards (basketball)
s.Oliver Würzburg players